The 1958 Star World Championships were held in San Diego, United States 18–23 August 1958. The hosting yacht club was San Diego Yacht Club.

Results

References

Star World Championships
1958 in sailing
Star World Championships in the United States